Logghe could refer to:

 Heather Logghe, surgical research fellow
 Koenraad Logghe, Flemish politician
 Logghe Stamping Company (Logghe Brothers), funny car chassis builders